5 Years is the first best album by Japanese pop singer Kaela Kimura, released on February 3, 2010. Limited edition has two CD.

Track listing

References

2010 albums
Kaela Kimura albums